This article covers the development of the industry in the Empire of Japan, during the rise of statism in the first part of the Shōwa era.

In its first 70 years, following the Meiji Restoration, factory production in Japan was all but non-existent, but by the first years of the Shōwa era, Japan was at a level comparable to many industrialized European countries. Industry in Japan grew both qualitatively and quantitatively. In 1920, the textile industry was the most important and Japan was known mainly as a manufacturer of wool and silk products, fabrics, fans, toys and similar goods. By 1939, however, industrial production in the areas of metallurgy and chemical products had grown by more than 100%.

Industrial output grew significantly during the period 1929-1942, while the total value of heavy industry in Japan, valued at approximately US$700 million in 1931, had risen to US$3.7 billion by 1940.

Taking the effects of inflation into consideration, this growth indicates a rise in profits of 400% in heavy industry between 1937 and 1940. At the same time as the extraordinary growth of heavy industry, and a 26% decline in consumption articles during the period 1937-1940, the textile industry maintained its principal place as the primary occupation for Japanese workers. At its relative height during this period, textile production employed approximately one million workers, or roughly 1/3 of the industrial workforce.

The rapid growth of pre-war and wartime Japanese industry is reminiscent of the Industrial Revolution in 18th century England.  The growth of profits during both periods was astonishing, in terms of both percentages and totals.

These developments would never have arisen, however, without an abundant
source of low priced and docile manpower and convenient access to raw materials, the latter—though vital—were (and still are) exceedingly rare in Japan. Access to both were important factors in Japan's rapid industrial development.

The average Japanese industrial worker worked long hours for a low salary. Before 1940, more than 90% of workers received less than US$7 per week. In later years, average pay rose by 50%, but the cost of living—the articles and services for which one needs salary—rose as well. In peacetime, the Japanese work week averaged 56 hours, compared with 35 hours in the United States and 39 hours in France. Furthermore, the war effort exposed a marked scarcity of specialized workers.

One final important element of Japanese industry was small-scale, subsistence industry. Prior to 1941, most of the middle class was employed in handcrafts in cottage industries and small workshops, which normally employed fewer than five workers.

Women often worked in this type of industry, and large-scale industry often obtained materials from the small-scale outfits, particularly rayon and cotton.

Industrial production statistics

In 1921 there were 87,398 factories with more than five workers; 71,321 used machines, the rest were hand manufacturing. In 1926, there were 51,906 factories with 1,875,000 employees growing in productivity with reduced employees due to mechanisation. The zone extended from the interior sea (Japanese Mediterranean sea) to the Kanto Plain, being the industrial heart of Japan. From Nagasaki and Hiroshima to Tokyo was 600 miles with a series of industrial cities: the region of Osaka-Kobe-Kioto, the axis Tokyo-Yokohama, Nagoya and Nagasaki, Hiroshima, Shimonoseki and Moji in North Kyūshū. The Osaka-Kobe-Kioto region makes traditional products, iron and steel, and others. The axis Tokyo-Yokohama manufactured machinery, electrical devices, printing, iron and steel works, and others various factories. Nagoya center poses hilatures and fiber factories and porcelain; the North Kyūshū centers produced high ovens, iron and steel works, iron laminations, shipyards, cement and crystal factories, coal coke processors etc. Additional to these centers were others in Kamaishi (North Honshū) for making iron bars, and Muroran (Hokkaido) similarly. The iron & steel industry was unique in that it produced twice more converter steel than bars of high ovens because of more use of scrap iron and old iron imported from overseas.

Other important centers were Heijo (Chosen) for Iron and Steel works, in Karafuto for Cellulose (paper raw material) manufacturing; Kwantung, for Iron & Steel Works (Anshan factory), in Formosa (Camphor and sugar cane processing) and South Mandate for Sugar cane processing. The fishing industry (the most extensive in coastal areas in all the Japanese empire), employed 1,500,000 persons (including 500,000 women and children). The "cultivated pearl" industry was centred in Toba (Shima area, in Ago Bay) where the Mikimoto Zaibatsu Clan held a monopoly. For military industry, see the additional information.

In 1927 and 1937, industrial production remained at ¥16,412,000,000, which represented three times the value of farming. The textile industry fell from 41.4% in 1926 to 23.8% in 1936; metallurgical industries 6.4% in 1926 to 20.5% in 1936, and the chemical industry 18.6% in 1937 and machinery and industrial equipment growing to 14.5% in the same year. Japan's treaties with Germany provided licenses for installing certain heavy industry technologies. The result of these agreements, were the following factories:

Nippon Lurgi Goshi K.K.of Tokio, the company which administered factories with Metallgesellschaft-Lurgi, Frankfurt am Main A.G. (For Manchoukouan plants see Manchukuo investments)
Mitsui Kosan KK. Miiki (Ohmura)
Rumoe Plant, Hokkaido
Fukagawa,Takiwaga and Sunakawa Plants in Hokkaido
Chosen Sekitan K.K., Eian (Chosen)
Chosen Chisso Hiryo K.K., Agochi (Chosen)
South Sakhalin Mining and Railway Company, Naihoro/Oichai (Karafuto)
Nissan Ekitai Nenryo K.K. Wakamatsu
Ube Yuka Kogya K.K. (no.2).Ube
Tokuyama Plant

For more detailed information about Japanese-German Industrial relations pre–World War II and Japanese, Manchu and Chinese special factories see the link: http://www.fischer-tropsch.org/primary_documents/gvt_reports/CIOSC/cios_30_31_23.htm

Empire of Japan
Economic history of World War II
Economic history of Japan
Industry in Japan